Utetheisa galapagensis is a moth of the family Erebidae. It is known only from the Galápagos island of San Cristóbal. It is probably endemic to the archipelago.

Larvae have been reared on Tournefortia pubescens, but probably also feed on other Tournefortia species.

External links
Two new species of Utetheisa Hübner (Lepidoptera, Noctuidae, Arctiinae) from the Galapagos Islands, Ecuador

galapagensis
Endemic fauna of the Galápagos Islands
Moths of South America
Moths described in 1860